Paul Goldman (born 1957) is an Australian film director, screenwriter and cinematographer.

Goldman was born in Melbourne, Victoria, Australia, and studied at Swinburne Film and Television School.<ref name=hawk>Hawker, Phillippa (23 May 2013). "Rewind! Video clips thrilled the radio stars", The Sydney Morning Herald. Retrieved 8 July 2018.</ref>

He was cinematographer on the 1988 film Ghosts... of the Civil Dead, co-written by Nick Cave and directed by John Hillcoat.

He won the 2002 AACTA Award for Best Adapted Screenplay for Australian Rules'', a film he also directed.

Apart from directing feature films and documentaries, Goldman has also directed music videos, including "Nick the Stripper" (1980) by The Birthday Party, and "Better the Devil You Know" (1990) by Kylie Minogue. He won the MTV Video Music Award for Best Male Video for directing Elvis Costello's "Veronica" (1989).

Filmography

Awards and nominations

ARIA Music Awards
The ARIA Music Awards is an annual awards ceremony that recognises excellence, innovation, and achievement across all genres of Australian music. They commenced in 1987. 

! 
|-
| 1992
| Paul Goldman for "Cry" by Lisa Edwards
| Best Video
| 
|rowspan="2" |   
|-
| 2007
| Paul Goldman for "Straight Lines" by Silverchair
| Best Video
| 
|-

References

External links
 

1957 births
Living people
Australian film directors
Australian screenwriters
Film directors from Melbourne
Australian music video directors